The Special Appellate College (KPA) is an independent institution that is constitutionally tasked to oversee the transitional reassessment of judges and prosecutors in the Republic of Albania. 

The reassessment process is carried out on the basis of three criteria: re-evaluation of wealth, personal character, professional skills. 

A panel of 7 judges reviews the appeals made by the judges and prosecutors against the decisions of the Independent Qualification Commission.

The KPA has disciplinary jurisdiction over the members of the Constitutional Court, the High Judicial Council, the High Council of Prosecution, the Prosecutor General and the High Inspectorate of Justice.

Judges
 Ardian Hajdari
 Natasha Mulaj
 Sokol Çomo
 Ina Rama
 Luan Daci
 Albana Shtylla
 Rezarta Schuetz

References

Vetting institutions of Albania